"Young Thing, Wild Dreams (Rock Me)" is a song by the band Red Rider, released in 1984 as a single and climbing to No. 71 on the Billboard Hot 100, No. 13 on the Mainstream Rock chart, and No. 44 in Canada.

The song
Written by band leader Tom Cochrane, "Young Thing" was the first single from their 1984 album Breaking Curfew. It was released with a video that got some play on MTV.

Personnel
 Tom Cochrane - lead vocals, guitars, keyboards
 Ken Greer - guitars, keyboards, backing vocals
 Rob Baker - drums, percussion
 Jeff Jones - bass guitar, backing vocals
 John Webster - keyboards

Additional personnel
 Steve Sexton - keyboards
 Earle Seymour - saxophone
 Rough Maids - backing vocals
 Norman Moore - art direction and design
 Beverly Parker - photography

References

1984 singles
Capitol Records singles
Songs written by Tom Cochrane
Red Rider songs
1984 songs